James FitzGerald-Villiers (1708 – 12 December 1732), styled Lord Villiers from 1721, was an Anglo-Irish politician from the Villiers family. 

FitzGerald-Villiers was the eldest son of John Villiers, 1st Earl Grandison and Frances Cary. He was the Member of Parliament for Waterford County in the Irish House of Commons between 1730 and his death in 1732. FitzGerald-Villiers married Jane Butler, daughter of Richard Butler, on 10 July 1728 but they had no issue. Both he and his younger brother predeceased their father, meaning that John Villiers' earldom became extinct upon his death in 1766.

References

1708 births
1732 deaths
18th-century Anglo-Irish people
Irish MPs 1727–1760
Members of the Parliament of Ireland (pre-1801) for County Waterford constituencies
James